This is a list of the 108 Shiva Temples mentioned in the Shivalaya Stothram.

Background

According to Hindu beliefs, Lord Parasurama created the land between Gokarna and Kanyakumari. It is said that Kerala was reclaimed from the ocean using his axe for donating to Brahmins after the killing of King Kartavirya Arjuna and other Kshatriyas. He split this land in to 64 villages (64 gramas). Out of these 64 villages, 32 villages are in between Perumpuzha and Gokarnam and the spoken language was Tulu. The remaining 32 villages were in the Malayalam-speaking area between Perumpuzha and Kanyakumari.

Parasurama is the sixth avatar of Maha Vishnu; he was the youngest son of sage Jamadagni and Renuka. According to legend, after donating the land to Brahmins, one hundred and eight Maha Shiva Lingam and Durga idols were installed in these 64 villages. These hundred and eight Shiva temples are mentioned in the Shivala Sotram and a song is written in the Malayalam language.  Of the 108 Shiva temples, 105 temples are situated in Kerala state, two temples in Karnataka and one in Kanyakumari District of Tamil Nadu.

List of temples

References

Shiva temples in Kerala
Lists of Hindu temples in India
108 Shiva Temples